Judy Veronica Thomas (born 4 June 1980), known professionally as Judi Love, is an English stand-up comedian and presenter. She began her stand-up career in 2011 but came to prominence as a panellist on the ITV talk show Loose Women. As well as competing on the BBC competition series MasterChef, Love also competed in the nineteenth series of Strictly Come Dancing; finishing in tenth place, and the thirteenth series of Taskmaster.

Early and personal life 
Judi Love was born on 4 June 1980 in Hackney, London to Jamaican parents and is the youngest of five children. She spent the majority of her youth in and around the East London area. Love studied a degree in Community Arts and Social Science and a Masters in Social Work from the Tavistock Institute. Love has two children, a daughter and a son.

Career
Love began comedy when she performed a set in front of her class for a module, in which she revealed the comedic side of caring for her mother, who died in 2009 with dementia. In 2011, Love made her professional stage debut with a show titled Laughter Is Healing. Love hosted the 2019 London Critics' Circle Awards, and in 2020, she began appearing as a panellist on the ITV talk show Loose Women. Love also appeared on Celebrity MasterChef in July 2020, in which she was a finalist. In 2021, Love was announced as a contestant on the nineteenth series of Strictly Come Dancing. She was eliminated on 31 October 2021, finishing in tenth place. Love has most recently starred in series 13 of Taskmaster, alongside presenters Greg Davies and Alex Horne.

Filmography

See also
 List of Strictly Come Dancing contestants

References

External links
 
 

1980 births
English people of Jamaican descent
English women comedians
Living people
People from the London Borough of Hackney